Chenoweth is a name of Cornish origin meaning "new house" (Chy nowydh) in the Cornish language. Chenowith, Chinowith, Chernoweth, and Chernowith are alternative spellings.

People

Real
 Alice Chenoweth (1853–1925), birth name of American author and activist Helen H. Gardener 
 Blair Chenoweth (born 1981), American dance instructor, former Miss Alaska
 Caroline Van Deusen Chenoweth (1846–1917), American educator and diplomat
 Ellen Chenoweth, contemporary American casting director 
 Eric Chenowith (born 1979), American basketball player
 Erica Chenoweth (born 1980), American political scientist
 Florence Chenoweth (born 1945), Liberian agriculture and food security specialist 
 Francis A. Chenoweth (1819–1899), American politician
 Helen Chenoweth-Hage (1938–2006), American politician
 John Chenoweth (Colorado politician) (1897–1986), American politician
 Kristin Chenoweth (born 1968), American actress and singer
 Laura Chenoweth Butz (1860–1939), American educator
 Lemuel Chenoweth (1811–1887), American covered bridge builder
 Richard Chenoweth (18th century), builder of Fort Nelson, Kentucky
 Vida Chenoweth (1928-2018), ethnomusicologist, marimbist and linguist

Fictional
 Brenda Chenowith, on the television series Six Feet Under
 Billy Chenowith, brother of Brenda Chenowith on Six Feet Under

See also

 Chynoweth

References

Surnames
Cornish-language surnames
Toponymic surnames